Aiguafreda may refer to:

 Aiguafreda, Vallès Oriental, a municipality in the province of Barcelona, Catalonia, Spain
 , a resort in the municipality of Begur, province of Girona, Catalonia, Spain